5F-EMB-PINACA (also known as 5F-AEB) is an indazole-based synthetic cannabinoid from the indazole-3-carboxamide family that has been sold online as a designer drug.

It was first reported by the EMCDDA as part of a seizure of 149 grams of white powder in Sweden in April 2015.

Legal status 
5F-EMB-PINACA is illegal in Sweden as of 26. January 2016.

See also

 5F-AB-PINACA
 5F-ADB
 5F-AMB
 5F-APINACA
 AB-CHMINACA
 AB-FUBINACA
 AB-CHFUPYCA
 AB-PINACA
 ADB-CHMINACA
 ADB-FUBINACA
 ADB-PINACA
 AMB-FUBINACA
 APINACA
 MDMB-FUBINACA
 MDMB-CHMINACA
 PX-2
 PX-3

References

Cannabinoids
Designer drugs
Organofluorides
Indazolecarboxamides